Colin McNaughton (born 18 May 1951) is a British writer and illustrator of over seventy children's books. He is also a poet, focusing mainly on humorous children's poetry. He trained in graphic design at the Central School of Art and Design in London followed by an MA in illustration at the Royal College of Art. He lives in London.

Childhood
McNaughton was born in Wallsend, Northumberland in 1951, the son of a shipyard worker and a school dinner lady. As a child, there was little indication that he would become one of Britain's leading creators of children's picture books. There were no books at all in the family home, but there were always comics, his formative literature, and their slapstick humour has been a lasting influence.

Books
McNaughton's first book was published while he was still at the RCA.

His exuberant picture books with their comic-strip techniques, often take the form of an extended joke:

McNaughton's books include the Preston Pig series: Suddenly!, Boo!, Oops!, Goal!, Hmm... and Shh (Don't Tell Mister Wolf!) all of which feature Preston Pig and his near escapes from Mr Wolf. A television series was developed from these books for CITV.

His most notable book is perhaps There's an Awful Lot of Weirdos in Our Neighbourhood, a collection of poetry written in conjunction with Allan Ahlberg, and which was published in 1989. Colin McNaughton has worked with Allan Ahlberg on a number of books, including three of the Happy Families series, Mr and Mrs Hay the Horse, 
Miss Brick the Builders' Baby and Mrs Jolly's Joke Shop.

McNaughton worked with illustrator Satoshi Kitamura to create Once Upon an Ordinary School Day, published in 2004.

List (incomplete) of published books

1 2 3 And Things ; Author: Colin McNaughton; Publisher: Ernest Benn Ltd
A B C And Things ; Author: Colin McNaughton; Publisher: Ernest Benn Ltd
Dracula's Tomb ; Author: Colin McNaughton; Publisher: Candlewick
Not Last Night But the Night Before; Author: Colin McNaughton; Illustrator: Emma Chichester Clark; Publisher: Walker Books Ltd
Soccer Crazy ; Author: Colin McNaughton; Publisher: Mathew Price Ltd.
We're Off to Look for Aliens; Author: Colin McNaughton; Illustrator: Colin McNaughton; Publisher: Candlewick
Here Come the Aliens! ; Author: Colin McNaughton; Publisher: Walker Books Ltd
Captain Abdul's Little Treasure ; Author: Colin McNaughton; Publisher: Walker Books Ltd
If Dinosaurs Were Cats and Dogs; Author: Colin McNaughton; Publisher: Mathew Price Ltd
Potty Poo-poo Wee-wee!; Author: Colin McNaughton; Publisher: Walker Books Ltd
Once Upon an Ordinary School Day; Author: Colin McNaughton; Illustrator: Satoshi Kitamura; Publisher: Farrar, Straus and Giroux (BYR)
What Now, Cushie Butterfield; Author: Colin McNaughton; Publisher: HarperCollins Publishers Limited
Lemmy Was a Diver; Author: Colin McNaughton; Publisher: ANDERSEN (RAND)
Jolly Roger And The Pirates Of Captain Abdul; Author: Colin McNaughton; Illustrator: Colin McNaughton; Publisher: Tandem Library
She's a Little Cow; Author: Colin McNaughton; Publisher: Collins
S.W.A.L.K. (Preston Pig); Author: Colin McNaughton; Publisher: Picture Lions
Who's Been Sleeping in My Porridge?; Author: Colin McNaughton; Publisher: Candlewick
Wish You Were Here (and I Wasn't); Author: Colin McNaughton; Illustrator: Colin McNaughton; Publisher: Candlewick Press (MA)
I'm Talking Big!; Author: Colin McNaughton; Publisher: Walker Books Ltd
Good News, Bad News; Author: Colin McNaughton; Illustrator: Colin McNaughton; Publisher: Collins
Oomph!: A Preston Pig Story; Author: Colin McNaughton; Publisher: Harcourt Children's Books
Don't Step on the Crack!; Author: Colin McNaughton; Illustrator: Colin McNaughton; Publisher: Dial Books
Little Goal!: A Preston Pig Toddler Book; Author: Colin McNaughton; Publisher: Red Wagon Books
Little Oops!: A Preston Pig Toddler Book; Author: Colin McNaughton; Publisher: Red Wagon Books
Little Boo!: A Preston Pig Toddler Book; Author: Colin McNaughton; Publisher: Red Wagon Books
Little Suddenly!: A Preston Pig Toddler Book; Author: Colin McNaughton; Publisher: Red Wagon Books
Mr and Mrs Hay the Horse; Author: Allan Ahlberg; Illustrator: Colin McNaughton; Publisher: Puffin Books
Miss Brick the Builders' Baby; Author: Allan Ahlberg; Illustrator: Colin McNaughton; Publisher: Puffin Books
Mrs Jolly's Joke Shop; Author: Allan Ahlberg; Illustrator: Colin McNaughton; Publisher: Puffin Books
There's an Awful Lot of Weirdos in our Neighbourhood; Author: Colin McNaughton; Publisher: Walker Books Ltd

Awards
McNaughton won the British Book Award, Design and Production in 1989 for Jolly Roger and in 1993 for Making Friends with Frankenstein. He won the Kurt Maschler Award, or "the Emil", in 1991 for Have You Seen Who's Just Moved in Next Door to Us? (Walker), which he wrote and illustrated. That award from Maschler Publications and Booktrust annually recognised one "work of imagination for children, in which text and illustration are integrated so that each enhances and balances the other." 

He won the 1996 Nestlé Smarties Book Prize in category 0–5 years for Oops!.

Runners-up, etc.
 Jolly Roger — 1988 Smarties Prize; W H Smith Illustration Award; Kurt Maschler Award
 Watch Out for the Giant-Killers! — 1991 Earthworm Award
 Who's That Banging on the Ceiling — 1992 British Book Award, Design and Production
 Suddenly! — 1994 Smarties Prize
 Here Come the Aliens! — 1996 Sheffield Children's Book Award; 1996 Kate Greenaway Medal

References

External links

 

 Colin McNaughton at Library of Congress Authorities — with 74 catalogue records

1951 births
Living people
English children's writers
English illustrators
British children's book illustrators
People from Wallsend
Writers from Tyne and Wear
Alumni of the Central School of Art and Design
Alumni of the Royal College of Art